Homestead may refer to:

Homestead (buildings), a farmhouse and its adjacent outbuildings; by extension, it can mean any small cluster of houses
Homestead (unit), a unit of measurement equal to 160 acres
Homestead principle, a legal concept that one can establish ownership of unowned property through living on it
Homestead Acts, several United States federal laws that gave millions of acres to farmers known as homesteaders
Homestead exemption (U.S. law), a legal program to protect the value of a residence from expenses and/or forced sale arising from the death of a spouse
Homesteading, a lifestyle of agrarian self-sufficiency as practiced by a modern homesteader or urban homesteader

Named places

Australia
Homestead, Queensland, a town and locality in the Charters Towers Region
The Homestead (Georges Hall, NSW), historical house
 "The Homestead" resort at El Questro Wilderness Park

United Kingdom

 The Homestead, Sandiway, a house in Cheshire, England, now called Redwalls

United States
 The Homestead (Flagstaff, Arizona), on the National Register of Historic Places listings in Coconino County, Arizona
 Homestead, Kern County, California
Homestead, Florida 
 Homestead Air Reserve Base, a U.S. Air Force base near Miami, Florida
 Homestead-Miami Speedway, an auto racing track in Homestead, Florida
 The Homestead (Evanston, Illinois), on the National Register of Historic Places listings in Evanston, Illinois
Homestead, Iowa
Homestead Temporary Shelter for Unaccompanied Children, in Florida
Homestead Township, Otter Tail County, Minnesota
Homestead, Missouri
Homestead, New Mexico
 The Homestead (Haverstraw, New York), listed on the NRHP in Rockland County, New York
 The Homestead (Geneseo, New York), NRHP-listed, a historic house in Livingston County, New York
 The Homestead (Saranac Lake, New York), listed on the NRHP in Franklin County, New York
 The Homestead (Waccabuc, New York), listed on the NRHP in Westchester County, New York
 The Homestead at Denison University, a student-run intentional community in Granville, Ohio
Homestead, Oklahoma
Homestead, Oregon
Homestead, Portland, Oregon
Homestead, Pennsylvania
Homestead, Wisconsin
Homestead Township, Michigan
 The Homestead (Hot Springs, Virginia), a luxury resort and a National Historic Landmark listed on the NRHP in Bath County, Virginia
 Homestead High School (disambiguation), the name of several high schools in the United States
Homestead Temporary Shelter for Unaccompanied Children, a migrant children's detention shelter in Florida

Arts and media
"Homestead" (Star Trek: Voyager), a 2001 episode of Star Trek: Voyager
Homestead, a 1998 novel by American writer Rosina Lippi
The Homestead, an artwork by John Steuart Curry
Homestead Records, a record label founded in 1983 and based in New York City
Homestead Records (1920s), an American record company of the 1920s
Homestead, fictional planetary migration company, Passengers

Other uses
Homestead (meteorite), a meteorite that fell in Homestead, Iowa in 1875
Homestead Strike, an 1892 labor confrontation at the Carnegie Steel Company in Homestead, Pennsylvania
Homestead Technologies, a web-hosting service based in Burlington, Massachusetts

See also
 Old Homestead (disambiguation)